Syed Mahmud Hossain (born 31 December 1954) was the 22nd Chief Justice of Bangladesh. He retired on 30 December 2021.

Early life and education
Hossain was born in 1954 to Syed Mustafa Ali (d. 2018) and Begum Kawsar Jahan. He completed his education life in Comilla town. The secondary school certificate from Comilla Zilla School in 1972, HSC examination from Comilla Victoria College in 1974 and passed from the same college in 1976 in the BSc examination. In 1980, he obtained LLB degree from Comilla Law College. He completed six-month long "Commonwealth Young Lawyers Course" from the School of Oriental African Studies and the Institute of Advanced Legal Studies, both part of University of London.

Career
In 1981, Hossain started practicing law in the District Judge Court. Then he joined as an advocate in the High Court Division in 1983. He was appointed as a deputy attorney general in 1999. He was appointed as Additional Justice of the High Court Division on 22 February 2001 and two years later, on 22 February 2003, the permanent appointment was made in the same department. On 23 February 2011, he was appointed as the Appellate Division's Justice. He was the chairman of the search committee formed to form the Election Commission twice. Hossain is a strong supporter of country's Digital Security Act. In a verdict made on 6 March 2021, Hossain cautioned that there would be no consideration of bail for people who would tarnish the image of Bangladesh in any manner. He argued that this is because the first priority is the image of the country.

References 

Living people
1954 births
People from Comilla District
Comilla Victoria Government College alumni
Alumni of SOAS University of London
20th-century Bangladeshi lawyers
Supreme Court of Bangladesh justices
Chief justices of Bangladesh
Place of birth missing (living people)
21st-century Bangladeshi lawyers